Archman is a village in Baherden District of Turkmenistan, famed for the eponymous hot springs located about 11 km away.

Etymology 
Legend has it that the hot springs (and the village) were named after a shepherd who had discovered its healing properties, after getting cured of a skin rash.

Medical Tourism 
The spa, Archman Sanitorium, was opened in 1915. Reputed for the healing properties of its water, different alternative treatment regimens—mineral spa, gastric lavage, balneotherapy, drinking therapy, and others—are available, in combination with medical imaging services and physiotherapy.

In 2001, President Niyazov opened a marble resort, replacing previous Soviet facilities; this was further expanded in 2009 into a 920-bed center. Primarily aimed at those patients who had to visit the sanatorium for about a week, the project has been fairly successful. There is one small mausoleum, devoted to Gochgar Ata, near the resort.

Limnology 
The water is slightly alkaline with low sulfide levels; it is classified as potable water. It is rich in minerals like chlorine, sodium, calcium, and magnesium.

Transportation
In 2003, an Iranian company was contracted to connect the M37 highway with the sanitorium. It is also served by an eponymous station on the Trans-Caspian Railway, about 9 km away.

Notes

References

Populated places in Ahal Region